The 2019 Osaka mayoral election was held on 7 April 2019 to elect the next mayor of Osaka. Incumbent Innovation mayor Hirofumi Yoshimura decided to not seek a second term as mayor of Osaka in order to run as Governor of Osaka. The result of the election was a victory for Governor of Osaka Prefecture Ichiro Matsui. He received 58% of the vote.

Candidates 
Ichiro Matsui, Governor of Osaka Prefecture for Nippon Ishin no Kai.
Akira Yanagimoto, City councillor back by LDP, Komeito, DPFP.

Results

References 

2019
2019 elections in Japan
Elections in Osaka Prefecture